ISO 22300:2021, Security and resilience – Vocabulary, is an international standard developed by ISO/TC 292 Security and resilience. This document defines terms used in security and resilience standards and includes 360 terms and definitions. This edition was published in the beginning of 2021 and replaces the second edition from 2018.

Scope and contents 
ISO 22300:2018 contains definitions for the following terms:

 activity
 affected area
 after-action report
 alert
 all clear
 all-hazards
 alternate worksite
 appropriate law enforcement and other government officials
 area at risk
 asset
 attack
 attribute data management system, ADMS
 audit
 auditor
 authentic material good
 authentication
 authentication element
 authentication function
 authentication solution
 authentication tool
 authoritative source
 authorized economic operator
 automated interpretation
 business continuity
 business continuity management
 business continuity management system, BCMS
 business continuity plan
 business continuity programme
 business impact analysis
 business partner
 capacity
 cargo transport unit
 certified client
 civil protection
 client
 closed-circuit television system, CCTV system
 colour blindness
 colour-code
 command and control
 command and control system
 communication and consultation
 community
 community-based warning system
 competence
 conformity
 consequence
 contingency
 continual improvement
 conveyance
 cooperation
 coordination
 correction
 corrective action
 counterfeit, verb
 counterfeit good
 countermeasure
 covert authentication element
 crisis
 crisis management
 crisis management team
 critical control point, CCP
 critical customer
 critical product or service
 critical supplier
 criticality analysis
 custodian copy
 custody
 disaster
 disruption
 document
 documented information
 downstream
 drill
 dynamic metadata
 effectiveness
 emergency
 emergency management
 entity
 evacuation
 evaluation
 event
 exercise
 exercise annual plan
 exercise coordinator
 exercise programme
 exercise programme manager
 exercise project team
 exercise safety officer
 facility
 false acceptance rate
 false rejection rate
 forensic
 forensic analysis
 full-scale exercise
 functional exercise
 geo-location
 goods
 hazard
 hazard monitoring function
 hue
 human interpretation
 human rights risk analysis, HRRA
 identification
 identifier
 identity
 impact
 impact analysis
 impartiality
 improvisation
 incident
 incident command
 incident management system
 incident preparedness
 incident response
 information
 infrastructure
 inherently dangerous property
 inject
 inspector
 inspector access history
 integrated authentication element
 integrity
 interested party
 internal attack
 internal audit
 international supply chain
 interoperability
 intrinsic authentication element
 invocation
 key performance indicator, KPI
 less-lethal force
 likelihood
 logical structure
 management
 management plan
 management system
 management system consultancy and/or associated risk assessment
 material good
 material good life cycle
 maximum acceptable outage, MAO
 maximum tolerable period of disruption, MTPD
 measurement
 metadata
 minimum business continuity objective, MBCO
 mitigation
 monitoring
 mutual aid agreement
 nonconformity
 notification
 object
 object examination function, OEF
 objective
 observer
 off-the-shelf authentication tool
 on-line authentication tool
 operational information
 organization
 organization in the supply chain
 outsource, verb
 overt authentication element
 owner
 participant
 partnering
 partnership
 people at risk
 performance
 performance evaluation
 personnel
 planning
 policy
 preparedness
 prevention
 prevention of hazards and threats
 preventive action
 prioritized activity
 private security service provider
 probability
 procedure
 process
 product or service
 protection
 public warning
 public warning system
 purpose-built authentication tool
 record
 recovery
 recovery point objective, RPO
 recovery time objective, RTO
 requirement
 residual risk
 resilience
 resource
 response plan
 response programme
 response team
 review
 rights holder
 risk
 risk acceptance
 risk analysis
 risk appetite
 risk assessment
 risk communication
 risk criteria
 risk evaluation
 risk identification
 risk management
 risk owner
 risk reduction
 risk register
 risk sharing
 risk source
 risk tolerance
 risk treatment
 robustness
 scenario
 scene location
 scope of exercise
 scope of service
 script
 secret
 security
 security aspect
 security cleared
 security declaration
 security management
 security management objective
 security management policy
 security management programme
 security management target
 security operation
 security operations management
 security operations objective
 security operations personnel
 security operations policy
 security operations programme
 security personnel
 security plan
 security sensitive information
 security threat scenario
 self-defence
 semantic interoperability
 sensitive information
 shelter in place, verb
 specifier
 stand-alone authentication tool
 static metadata
 strategic exercise
 subcontracting
 supply chain
 supply chain continuity management, SCCM
 syntactic interoperability
 tamper evidence
 target
 target group
 test
 testing
 threat
 threat analysis
 tier 1 supplier
 tier 2 supplier
 top management
 track and trace
 training
 trusted query processing function, TQPF
 trusted verification function, TVF
 undesirable event
 unique identifier, UID
 upstream
 use of force continuum
 verification
 vulnerability
 vulnerable group
 warning dissemination function
 work environment
 World Customs Organization, WCO

History

References

22300

External links
 ISO 22300:2018 — Security and resilience — Vocabulary (Withdrawn, revised by ISO 22300:2021)
 ISO 22300:2021 — Security and resilience — Vocabulary